Air Chief Marshal Sir Hubert Leonard Patch,  (16 December 1904 – 18 November 1987) was a senior Royal Air Force commander.

RAF career
Patch joined the Royal Air Force as a flight cadet in 1923 and served in the Second World War. After the war he became Director of Armament Requirements and then Air Officer Commanding No. 44 Group in 1946. He went on to be Commandant of the Aeroplane and Armament Experimental Establishment in 1948, Air Officer for Administration at Headquarters Far East Air Force in 1951 and Senior Air Staff Officer, Far East Air Force in 1952. After that he was made Air Officer Commanding No. 11 Group in 1953, Air Officer Commanding-in-Chief of Fighter Command in January 1956 and Commander-in-Chief of the RAF Middle East Air Force in September 1956. 

His final appointments were as Air Member for Personnel in April 1959 and as Commander, British Forces Arabian Peninsula in September 1959, where he established a unified tri-service command in Aden, before he retired in May 1961. From 1961 to 1963 he was the BAC Representative to NATO Countries.

References

|-

|-

|-

|-

|-

1904 births
1987 deaths
Commanders of the Order of the British Empire
Graduates of the Royal Air Force College Cranwell
Knights Commander of the Order of the Bath
Royal Air Force air marshals
Royal Air Force personnel of World War II
Place of birth missing
Place of death missing